Battle Borgs may refer to:
 The fighting machines of the Aquitian Rangers on Mighty Morphin Alien Rangers
 RoboBorg and Boron, collectively known as Battle Borgs, from the series BeetleBorgs Metallix